Ports is a comarca in the province of Castellón, Valencian Community, Spain. It mostly overlaps the historical comarca known as Ports de Morella.

Municipalities

The comarca is composed of thirteen municipalities, tabled below with their populations at the 2001 and 2011 Censuses, and according to the most recent official estimates (for 1 January 2019):

References

See also
Ports de Morella
Maestrat
Tinença de Benifassà

 
Comarques of the Valencian Community
Geography of the Province of Castellón
Maestrazgo